Kahveci (also spelled Kahwaji) is a Turkish and Arabic word meaning coffee producer. It is often used as a surname, it may refer to:

People
 Adnan Kahveci (1949–1993), Turkish politician
 Jean Kahwaji (born 1953), Lebanese commander of the Lebanese Armed Forces
 Nihat Kahveci (born 1979), Turkish footballer
 Ömer Kahveci (born 1992), Turkish footballer

Arabic-language surnames
Turkish-language surnames